Jihei Furusho (born 15 December 1914) was a Japanese water polo player. He competed in the men's tournament at the 1936 Summer Olympics.

See also
 Japan men's Olympic water polo team records and statistics
 List of men's Olympic water polo tournament goalkeepers

References

External links
 

1914 births
Year of death missing
Japanese male water polo players
Water polo goalkeepers
Olympic water polo players of Japan
Water polo players at the 1936 Summer Olympics